Elizabeth M. "Beth" Stephens (born November 18, 1960) is an American filmmaker, artist, sculptor, photographer, professor and two time Chair of the Art Department at UC Santa Cruz. Stephens, who describes herself as "ecosexual", collaborates with her wife since 2002, ecosexual artist, radical sex educator, and performer Annie Sprinkle.

Early life 
Stephens was born in Montgomery, West Virginia on November 18, 1960.  Her family co-owned Marathon Coal-bit company.  She grew up in Appalachia, moving to Boston, New Jersey, and later to San Francisco. In her youth, her family attended a Presbyterian church.

Career 
Stephens studied Fine Arts at Tufts University, The Museum School, and Rutgers University.  She worked with Martha Rosler and Geoffrey Hendricks in her graduate education.  She has been a professor at UCSC since 1993, chaired the department from 2006 until 2009 and again from 2017 until 2020.

Love Art Laboratory 
In December 2004, Stephens committed to doing seven years of art projects about love with her wife and art collaborator, Annie Sprinkle. They call this their Love Art Laboratory.  Part of their project was to do an experimental art wedding each year, and each year had a different theme and color. The seven-year structure was adapted to their project by invitation of artist Linda M. Montano. Sprinkle and Stephens have done seventeen art weddings, fourteen with ecosexual themes. Critics relate the project to contemporary political debates including marriage equality, ecofeminism, and the environmental movement.  Critics also note that Stephens' work explores and challenges the validity of the boundary between what is "art," and what is "pornography."

Ecosexuality 
Starting with their 2008 performance wedding to the Earth, Stephens and her partner Annie Sprinkle became pioneers of ecosexuality, a kind of earth-loving sexual identity, which states, "The Earth is our lover." Their Ecosex Manifesto proclaims that anyone can identify as an Ecosexual along with being "GLBTQI, heterosexual, asexual, and/or Other." They married the Earth, Sky, Sea, Moon, Appalachian Mountains, the Sun, and other non-human entities in nine different countries including at Montreal's Edgy Women Festival in 2011.

Feature films 

Most recently Stephens has produced and directed two feature documentary films with Annie Sprinkle: Water Makes Us Wet: An Ecosexual Adventure (2017) and Goodbye Gauley Mountain: An Ecosexual Love Story (2013), a film addressing Mountaintop removal mining near her birthplace and its effects on the environment and nearby communities.

International exhibitions 

Her work has been shown internationally, including at Museum Kunstpalast (Düsseldorf), El Ojo Atomico Antimuseo de Arte Contemporáneo  (Spain), Museo Reina Sophia (Madrid), the San Francisco Museum of Modern Art, 53rd Venice Biennale, and Documenta 14.

In 2017, Stephens and her wife/collaborator Annie Sprinkle were official artists in Documenta 14. They presented performances and visual art, lectured, and previewed their new film documentary, Water Makes Us Wet: An Ecosexual Adventure.

Awards 
Stephens was awarded a 2021 Guggenheim Fellowship in the creative arts category: film-video, appearing in the List of Guggenheim Fellowships awarded in 2021.

Bibliography

Director 
 2017 Water Makes Us Wet: An Ecosexual Adventure
 2013 Goodbye Gauley Mountain: An Ecosexual Love Story
 2006 Exposed; Experiments in Love, Sex, Death and Art
 2006 Orange Wedding Two
 2006 Red Wedding One
 2005 Kiss
 2004 Lüba; The Mother Teresa of Art
 1992 Do You Mind?
 1989 Interviews with Oaxacan Women
 1989 Women Eating

Articles 
 2017 Documenta 14: Daybook, eds. Laimer, Quinn, Adam Symczyk, Prestel Press, Munich-London-New York, 2017, Annie Sprinkle and Beth Stephens, April 24 pgs 19-20.
 2010  Post Porn Politics; Queer_Feminist Perspective on the Politics of Porn Performance and Sex_Work as Culture Production, Post Porn Brunch, Elizabeth M. Stephens, Annie M. Sprinkle and Cosey Fanni Tutti, ed. Tim Stüttgen, B_Books, Berlin, Germany pages 88–115
 2008  Live through This; On Creativity and Self Destruction, Double Trouble in the Love Art Lab: Our Breast Cancer Experiments. ed. Sabrina Chapadjiev, Seven Stories Press, New York, pp 105–117
 2004 Interview of Annie Sprinkle for Women and Performance — 20th Anniversary Issue, New York University Press
 1998 Looking Class Heroes: Dykes on Bikes Cruising Calendar Girls The Passionate Camera: Photography and Bodies of Desire

Books 
 2021 Assuming the Ecosexual Position: The Earth as Lover with Annie Sprinkle, Jennie Klein, Una Chaudhuri, Paul B. Preciado, and Linda M. Montano. University of Minnesota Press.

Film/Video 
 2017 Water Makes Us Wet: An Ecosexual Adventure
 2013  Goodbye Gauley Mountain: An Ecosexual Love Story
 2011  Purple Wedding to the Moon, White Wedding to the Snow
 2010  Purple Wedding to the Appalachian Mountains
 2009  Blue Wedding to the Sky/Sea Video
 2008  Green Wedding Four to the Earth
 2007  Big Nudes Descending a Staircase
 2007  Etant Donnees
 2007  Yellow Wedding Three
 2006  Exposed; Experiments in Love, Sex, Death and Art
 2006  Orange Wedding Two
 2006  Red Wedding One
 2005  Kiss
 2004  Lüba; The Mother Teresa of Art
 1992  Do You Mind?
 1989  Interviews with Oaxacan Women
 1989  Women Eating

References

External links 
 sprinklestephens.org
 Art Department page at University of California, Santa Cruz (UCSC)
 Curriculum Vitae
 Love Art Lab
 SexEcology
 Ecosex Manifesto
 E.A.R.T.H. Lab SF

Feminist artists
American LGBT sculptors
American LGBT entertainers
Living people
Rutgers University alumni
American sex educators
Sex-positive feminists
Third-wave feminism
Tufts University alumni
LGBT feminists
1960 births
University of California, Santa Cruz faculty
People from Montgomery, West Virginia
University of California, Davis alumni
Queer feminists
Artists from West Virginia
LGBT film directors